Alcino Marchiano Izaacs (born 16 November 1993 in Windhoek, Namibia) is a Namibian rugby union player who most recently played with South African side the . He can play as a winger or a full-back.  He now currently plays for College Rovers, a popular rugby club in Durban where many semi-professional rugby players play. Rovers are arguably the strongest club in KZN.

Career

Youth

While attending Namib High School in Swakopmund, Isaacs was selected to represent 's Under–16 side at the 2009 Grant Khomo Week competition and in 2010 at the Under-18 Academy Week competition. He also played for Namibia in the Under–19 All-African Cup competition.

Sharks

He then moved to Durban, South Africa to join the  Academy for the 2012 season. He represented the  side during the 2012 Under-19 Provincial Championship, scoring five tries in thirteen appearances for the side. He progressed to the  team over the next two seasons, weighing in with three tries in the 2013 Under-21 Provincial Championship and with four in the 2014 Under-21 Provincial Championship.

He also made his first senior appearances in 2014, playing in seven of the 's matches during the 2014 Vodacom Cup.

References

1993 births
Living people
Namibian rugby union players
Rugby union fullbacks
Rugby union players from Windhoek
Rugby union wings
Sharks (Currie Cup) players
Sharks (rugby union) players